The National Association of Regulatory Utility Commissioners (NARUC) is the national association representing the state public service commissioners who regulate essential utility services, including energy, telecommunications, and water. NARUC members are responsible for assuring reliable utility service at fair, just, and reasonable rates. Founded in 1889, the Association is a resource for its members and the regulatory community, providing a venue to set and influence public policy, share best practices, and foster solutions to improve regulation.

Each summer, NARUC holds committee meetings. Major issues in 2016 for regulatory commissioners were rate design and the EPA's Clean Power Plan. Rate design deals with the issue of how to charge (and pay) customers who generate their own electricity through means such as rooftop solar devices. Consumers whose homes or businesses have solar panels that generate power can typically sell back excess electricity to the power grid in a process called net metering. For 2017, from its annual conference (held in July in San Diego), interoperability was a key issue. According to experts from the conference, it is important that the electric grid and smart technologies can work together. The concept is referred to as interoperability. This refers to the ability of different systems being able to share information with each other, interpret the data that they share, and present it to consumers in a way that is accessible.

The NARUC Board of Directors formally adopted the “Distributed Energy Resources Rate Design and Compensation” manual during NARUC’s annual meeting in La Quinta, California in November 2016. The manual was created as a guide for utility regulators in the process of implementing appropriate DER rate design and compensation policies.

The president of NARUC is Brandon Presley, who was appointed in November 2019 to the position. He serves as Chairman of Mississippi Public Service Commission.

Committees and task forces

Standing committees 
NARUC has eight standing committees that propose policies for NARUC to support on federal and state issues.

Consumer Affairs 
The Consumer Affairs Committee examines how state commissions protect consumer interests as it relates to many industries, including the telecommunications and energy industries. Major issues include "slamming", information protection, and consumer education.

Critical Infrastructure 
This committee was created after the 2001 terrorist attacks to look at security concerns surrounding utility infrastructure. The committee helps state regulators share best practices and collaborate about the best security practices. The committee chairman is Richard S. Mroz of the New Jersey Board of Public Utilities. It has one subcommittee, the Staff Subcommittee on Critical Infrastructure which is chaired by Lynn P. Costantini of the New Jersey Board of Public Utilities.

Electricity 
According to NARUC, the "Electricity Committee develops and advances policies that promote reliable, adequate, and affordable supply of electricity." The committee works closely with the Federal Energy Regulatory Commission (FERC) and other federal agencies.

The committee chairman is Edward S.  Finley, Jr. of the North Carolina Utilities Commission. It has six subcommittees:
 Staff Subcommittee on Electricity
 Staff Subcommittee on Electric Reliability
 Staff Subcommittee on Clean Coal and Carbon Management
 Staff Subcommittee on Nuclear Issues-Waste Disposal
 Subcommittee on Nuclear Issues-Waste Disposal
 Subcommittee on Clean Coal and Carbon Management
According to experts from a NARUC conference in July 2017, it is important that the electric grid and smart technologies can work together. The concept is referred to as interoperability. This refers to the ability of different systems being able to share information with each other, interpret the data that they share, and present it to consumers in a way that is accessible.

Energy Resources and the Environment 
The committee works with state regulators to find ways to create environmentally sustainable and affordable energy for utilities. Major issues the committee focuses on include:
 Energy efficiency
 Protection of the environment
 Renewable energy and distributed resources (net metering)
 Assistance to low-income utility customers

Gas 
The Committee on Gas hosts panel discussions and educational sessions to help NARUC's constituency understand issues affecting natural gas. The committee works with FERC, the U.S. Department of Energy and the U.S. Department of Transportation. These collaborations include research and publication of white papers and other materials aimed at solving current and futue gas-related challenges.

The chairman is Stan Wise of the Georgia Public Service Commission. It has three subcommittees: the Staff Subcommittee on Gas; Staff Subcommittee on Pipeline Safety; and Subcommittee on Pipeline Safety, which is chaired by Norman Saari, a commissioner on the Michigan Public Service Commission.

International Relations 
According to NARUC, "With the trend of energy market development expands overseas, several countries have sought help and best practices from their American counterparts. The International Committee manages NARUC's outreach activities across the globe, including partnerships with numerous countries in Eastern Europe, Africa, and Bangladesh."

Telecommunications 
Since the telecommunications industry was deregulated in 1996, both the industry and the regulators' roles have quickly changed. The committee serves state regulators by sharing best practices and trends related to telecommunications issues. It works with many federal agencies, such as the Federal Communications Commission, Federal Trade Commission, and FBI.

Water 
The committee works with the EPA, water companies, and state water administrators to discuss issues about the use and reuse of water.

Task forces

Innovation 
The Task Force on Innovation focuses on new technologies and innovation in the utility sector. Topics will include:
 Integrated energy networks
 Battery storage
 Renewables
 Smart networks
 Information technologies
 Data analytics
 Internet of Things
 New technology regulations

Veterans' Workforce 
The Task Force on Veterans' Workforce  will focus on veterans programs and job opportunities in the utilities sector.

Board of Directors 
The following board members are officers or committee or task force chairs:

The remaining board members are:

NARUC appointed two new board members at its winter meeting in 2017. Doug Little of the Arizona Corporation Commission was appointed to a term that begins immediately in February 2017 and ends in October 2020. As an Arizona Corporation Commissioner, Little was first elected in November 2014 and served as the chairman in 2016. He was the vice chairman of the Western Energy Imbalance Market Body of State Regulators and is a member of the Western Interconnection Regional Advisory Board.

Chris Nelson is a commissioner on the South Dakota Public Utilities Commission. He was appointed to serve on the board of NARUC on January 12, 2017 through October 2018. He previously served on the board in 2014 and was the chairman of the Committee on Telecommunications.  He previously served as the South Dakota Secretary of State for eight years.

Issues 
At the NARUC winter committee meeting on February 13, 2017, two experts discussed the elements that determine solar value and the benefits and challenges of utility scale versus rooftop solar.

Solar prices, subsidies, net metering rules, and technology are all elements that determine the value of solar energy. Rooftop solar, also known as distributed solar, has upsides and downsides. Upsides include peak shaving, resiliency, voltage and frequency support, the distribution of power where it is developed, load reduction, and the flow of energy back into the system. However, rooftop solar costs 2 to 3 times as much as utility scale solar and it gets subsidized. Utility scale solar contains nearly all of the "pro" arguments for rooftop solar, but without the subsidies.

The price of electricity storage has dropped dramatically in recent years and, as a result, it is becoming a more-viable source of energy and grid support. One of the key challenges facing the energy storage business sector is creating successful business models that can optimize electric storage technology within the regulated environment. A panel of experts testified on the subject at the 2018 NARUC Winter Policy Summit in Washington D.C. Panelists agreed that the storage market is growing considerably. Experts predicted 35 megawatts of installed storage capacity by 2025, of which 75 percent would be by utilities.

In October 2018, NARUC published a report that says that the Federal Energy Regulatory Commission (FERC) should modernize the Public Utility Regulatory Policies Act (PURPA) of 1978 for the energy sector, and why. In 1978, during a national energy crisis, Congress passed PURPA to encourage alternative energy sources at a time when gas was scarce. PURPA required that electric utilities purchase renewable energy from certain sources. Under the law, utilities were required to charge rates to customers that were reasonable.

State regulatory commissions

References

External links
 
 "Distributed Energy Resources Rate Design and Compensation". Published 2016 by NARUC.
 List of state regulatory commissions

Government-related professional associations in the United States
1889 establishments in the United States
Organizations established in 1889